A jumbee, jumbie, mendo or chongo in Colombia and Venezuela is a type of mythological spirit or demon in the folklore of some Caribbean countries. Jumbee is the generic name given to all malevolent entities. There are numerous kinds of jumbees, reflecting the Caribbean’s complex history and ethnic makeup, drawing on African, Amerindian, East Indian, Dutch, English, and even Chinese mythology.

Different cultures have different concepts of jumbees, but the general idea is that people who have been evil are destined to become instruments of evil (jumbee) in death. Unlike the ghost folklore which represents a wispy fog-like creature, the jumbee casts a dark shadowy figure.

Regional 
People in English-speaking Caribbean states that were colonized by the British commonly believe in this creature. The belief is also held by practitioners of Obeah, a form of mystical wizardry that encompasses traditional African beliefs and Western European, primarily Anglican, images and beliefs concerning the dead. Guyana, and various islands—including Antigua and Barbuda in the east, The Bahamas in the north and as far south as Trinidad—have long held a tradition of folklore that includes the jumbee.

In the French islands Guadeloupe and Martinique, people speak of Zombi rather than Jumbie to describe ghosts, revenants and other supernatural creatures. The Étang Zombi in Guadeloupe owes its name to the legend of the wife of a slaver who was killed by her husband for trying to free his slaves and now haunts the pond.

The people of the Congo speak of what they believe to be a Nfumbi—ancestral ghost—which could be related to the word Jumbie.

Trinidad and Tobago 
A Moko jumbie is a protecting spirit in Trinidad and Tobago.

The Bahamas 
As Elsie Worthington Clews Parsons captured in a 1918 transcription of an old Bahamian story, the jumbee in Jamaica is often called a "sprit": "Dese sprits which you call witch people, dey lives in de air."

Jamaica and Barbados
In Jamaica and Barbados, a jumbee is called a duppy.

Montserrat 
In the folk religion of Montserrat, a jumbie is a ghost, or spirit of the dead. Jumbies are said to possess people during ceremonies called jumbie dances, which are accompanied by jumbie drums. Four couples perform a set of five progressively quicker quadrilles during the jumbie dance, switching out with other couples until someone is eventually possessed by a jumbie.

Jumbies receive numerous small offerings from Montserratians, such as a few drops of rum or food. They are also the subject of numerous superstitions. It is believed that the spirit separates from the body three days after death, at which point the havoc begins. Jumbies are believed to have the ability to shape-shift, usually taking the form of a dog, pig, or more likely, a cat.

Characteristics 
There are many recommended ways to avoid or escape jumbie encounters:

 If a pair of shoes is left outside the front door of a house, jumbies (who have either no feet at all, or backwards feet) will spend the entire night trying and failing to put on the shoes, rather than entering the house.
 Jumbies are similarly distracted by a heap of sand or salt or rice outside a door, since their obsessive curiosity (particularly in the case of the Firerass, or ole Higue) compels them to count every grain before the sun rises. Likewise, a rope with many knots in it will keep a jumbie busy trying to undo them until sunrise.
 Upon coming home late at night, walking backwards may prevent a jumbee from following one inside.
 If a jumbee chases a person, crossing a river may stop them; since it is believed that jumbees, like their relatives in numerous cultures, cannot follow over water.

See also 
 "Jumbie Jamberee", a popular calypso song
 Wekufe
 Henry S. Whitehead and the collection Jumbee and Other Uncanny Tales
 Zombie

References

Sources 
 
 
 [link broken Guyanese folklore] at Guyana Outpost
 Hochschild, Adam. King Leopold's Ghost: A Story of Greed, Terror, and Heroism in Colonial Africa. Boston, New York: Houghton Mifflin (1998, p. 15).

Caribbean legendary creatures
Native American demons
Guyanese culture
Montserratian culture
Trinidad and Tobago culture